Lapointe was a federal electoral district in Quebec, Canada that was represented in the House of Commons of Canada from 1949 to 1979. 

This riding was created in 1947 from parts of Chicoutimi riding. It consisted of the city of Arvida and the towns of Kénogami and Jonquière and the western part of the county of Chicoutimi.

The electoral district was abolished in 1976 when it was redistributed into Jonquière and Lac-Saint-Jean ridings.

Members of Parliament

This riding elected the following Members of Parliament:

Election results

See also 

 List of Canadian federal electoral districts
 Past Canadian electoral districts

External links
Riding history from the Library of Parliament

Former federal electoral districts of Quebec